Pickled pork may refer to:

Various types of pickled Head cheese
Pickled pork, also referred to as pickle meat, a Louisiana specialty often serves with red beans and rice.